Karuvannoor is a village in Irinjalakuda municipality of Trichur, Kerala, India bordered by Moorkanade, Mapranam and Karalam. The Karuvannur river passes though the village, resulting in its name. The name is also spelled Karuvanoore, Karuvanur, Karuvanure, Karuvannur or Karuvannure.

Cities and towns in Thrissur district